Rakesh Shukla may refer to:

Rakesh Shukla (cricketer) (1948–2019), Indian cricketer
Rakesh Shukla (politician), Indian politician of the Bharatiya Janata Party
Rakesh Shukla (animal welfare activist), businessman and animal rights activist